Francesco Gabriele is a London-based Italian film director, screenwriter, and producer.

He graduated with an MA in Filmmaking from the London Film School and is a graduate of the American Academy of Dramatic Arts in Los Angeles.

In 2014, he founded the production company Thespian Films Ltd.

His short film Italian Miracle played at over 40 festivals worldwide. He was nominated for "Best International Short" and "Best Comedy" at the Academy Awards & BAFTA Qualifying LA-Short Fest and won, among other awards, the "Jury Award" at the Stony Brook Film Festival in New York and achieved international distribution.

In 2017 he wrote, produced and directed the feature Blue Hollywood. The film had its UK Premiere at the BT Tower in London as the closing night film of the BAFTA Qualifying British Urban Film Festival and it was also screened in numerous festivals in Canada, Italy, Sweden, Bulgaria, Germany, China, Russia and the USA receiving mentions and awards. In 2020 it was acquired by Janson Media and it’s currently distributed on Amazon Prime, BluRay and DVD in all English, Italian and French territories.

In 2020 he completed the short horror film For Sale , starring Nicolas Vaporidis and Randall Paul which premiered at Capri Hollywood International Film Festival and Flaiano Prizes.

Francesco is a member of Directors UK and the Screen Acting Program Lead on the BA Acting at St Mary's University in London.

References

External links 
 
 Francesco Gabriele on Directors UK

1987 births
Living people
Italian film directors
Italian film producers
Italian screenwriters
Alumni of the London Film School
American Academy of Dramatic Arts alumni